is a Japanese tarento and gravure idol who is a former member of the idol group AKB48 under Team A. Kawasaki is the representative director of the Anti Minns Corporation. Kawasaki's husband is tarento and model Alexander.

As an AKB48 member

Single A-sides participated in

Other songs participated in

Stage units

Publications

Videos
(Her works with AKB48 are excluded)

Filmography

TV programmes
Current appearances

Former appearances

Films

Stage

Radio

Advertisements

Internet

Bibliography

Photobooks

Essays

Trading cards

References

External links
 
 

Japanese idols
Japanese businesspeople
Japanese women singers
AKB48 members
Actresses from Kanagawa Prefecture
1987 births
Living people
Models from Kanagawa Prefecture
Musicians from Kanagawa Prefecture